George Brockwell Gill (1857–1954) was an architect in Ipswich, Queensland, Australia. Many of the buildings he designed are heritage-listed.

Early life
George Brockwell Gill was born in 1857 in the Lambert district of Surrey, England.

Architectural career
Gill emigrated from London and settled in Ipswich in 1886 where he commenced work as an architect for the firm of Samuel Shenton. Gill took over Shenton's practice in 1889 when Shenton retired. Gill had been elected Associate of the Queensland Institute of Architects in 1904 and Fellow by 1913. He was its Vice-President in 1914-16 and President in 1918-19.

Significant works include:
 Baptist Church
 Bostock Chambers
 Charleville War Memorial
 City View Hotel
 Esk War Memorial
 Fairy Knoll
 Ipswich Flour Mill
 Hotel Metropole
 Ipswich Club House
 Ipswich Girls Grammar School
 Ipswich Grammar School
 Marburg Community Centre and First World War Memorial
Pen Y Llechwedd
 Queen Victoria Silver Jubilee Memorial Technical College
 Soldiers' Memorial Hall
 St Paul's Young Men's Club
 St Pauls Anglican Church and Rectory (1929 western extension and 1895 rectory) 
 Uniting Church Central Memorial Hall
 Woodlands

Later life
George Gill retired to Coolangatta in 1942, where he surfed every morning until about 1951. Aged 97 years, he died at his home at Rutledge Street, Coolangatta on 1 June 1954 following a short illness, a few days short of his 70th wedding anniversary. He was privately cremated at Mount Thompson Crematorium.

References

Attribution 

Architects from Queensland
1857 births
1954 deaths
People from Surrey (before 1889)
Articles incorporating text from the Queensland Heritage Register